Spinney may refer to:

A copse or thicket

People
Art Spinney (1927–1994), American football guard
Caroll Spinney (1933–2019), American puppeteer and cartoonist
Edgar Keith Spinney, (1851–1926), Canadian politician
Franklin C. Spinney (born 1945), American military analyst, author of the "Spinney Report"
George Wilbur Spinney (1889–1948), president of Bank of Montreal

Places
Spinney (Kettering BC Ward), an electoral ward in Northamptonshire, England
Spinney Abbey, a former monastery in Cambridgeshire, England
Spinney Hill, an area of Northampton, England
Spinney Hills, an area of Leicester, England
Spinney Hills, East Quogue, a leisure area in New York state
Spinney Mountain State Park, a state park in Colorado
The Spinney Local Nature Reserve, a reserve in Carshalton, London
Round Spinney, a locality in Northampton, England

Other uses
Spinneys, a supermarket chain
Empire Spinney, a ship built in 1941

See also
Spiny (disambiguation)